Star Wars: The Clone Wars is an American 3D CGI animated television series created by Lucasfilm Animation, Lucasfilm Animation Singapore, and CGCG Inc. The debut film was released in theaters on August 15, 2008; it served as the introduction of the series. The series made its debut on the American Cartoon Network on October 3, 2008. It is set in the fictional Star Wars galaxy during the three-year interim between Episode II – Attack of the Clones and Episode III – Revenge of the Sith (the same time period as the previous 2003 Clone Wars series). Each episode has a running time of 22 minutes, filling a half-hour time slot. 

In March 2013 following the acquisition of Lucasfilm by Disney the series was cancelled. The unreleased episodes that had already been produced were referred to at the time as "bonus content". The German television network Super RTL began to air these episodes as a sixth season, which consisted of 13 episodes in February 2014. Season 6, along with the other seasons and the feature film, were made available on Netflix on March 7 the same year.  The series returned with 12 new episodes on Disney+, serving as the seventh and final season. It premiered February 21, 2020.

Series overview

Note: episodes 37 to 43, 65, 66, and 109 to 119 aired earlier in some countries than their original U.S. release.

Episodes

Film (2008)
As a lead-in to the TV series of the same name, the film was released theatrically on August 15, 2008, and was distributed by Warner Bros. Pictures. Though critical reception was negative, the film was a box-office success and grossed $68.3 million worldwide against an $8.5 million budget.

Season 1 (2008–09)
The premiere episodes of Star Wars: The Clone Wars aired on October 3, 2008, and set a new record with Cartoon Network as their most-watched series premiere, attracting  total viewers. The season finale, "Hostage Crisis", was broadcast on March 20, 2009, and the original broadcast received  viewers. Season 1 depicted the attempts of the Republic and the Separatists to gain the allegiance of many planets and moons.

Season 2: Rise of the Bounty Hunters (2009–10)
The season two premiere, "Holocron Heist", was broadcast on October 2, 2009, and attracted  viewers. Episode 15 was first released in Canada. Episodes 16–21 were released in the UK before airing in the US. In season 2, the Sith resort to hiring bounty hunters and mercenaries to steal objects and intel or to assassinate targets for them. Meanwhile, the Jedi lead the Republic forces in an assault on the primary battle droid manufacturing facility.
The one-hour season finale combined of "R2 Come Home" and "Lethal Trackdown" was broadcast on April 30, 2010, and the original broadcast received  viewers.

Season 3: Secrets Revealed (2010–11)
The season three premiere, consisting of "Clone Cadets" and "ARC Troopers", was broadcast on September 17, 2010, attracting  viewers. These episodes, and certain others in this season, cover events from previous seasons. Episodes 21 and 22 were released in the UK before airing in the US. The season finale, consisting of "Padawan Lost" and "Wookiee Hunt", was broadcast on April 1, 2011, attracting  viewers.

Season 4: Battle Lines (2011–12)
The season four premiere, consisting of "Water War" and "Gungan Attack", was broadcast on September 16, 2011, and attracted  viewers, the lowest premiere viewing of all seasons. The season finale, "Revenge" was broadcast on March 16, 2012, attracting 2.03 million viewers. This season marks the return of Darth Maul.

Season 5 (2012–13)
The season five premiere, "Revival", was broadcast on September 29, 2012, and attracted  viewers. Season five consisted of 20 episodes instead of the normal 22 episode count. The season five finale, "The Wrong Jedi", was broadcast on March 2, 2013, and attracted  viewers. Unlike the first four seasons, the episodes of the fifth season were released to DVD and Blu-ray in chronological order as opposed to broadcast order.

Season 6: The Lost Missions (2014)
The sixth season was released in its entirety on March 7, 2014, on Netflix. The season had already premiered in Germany on February 15 the same year, on Super RTL.

Season 7: The Final Season (2020)
The Clone Wars returned with 12 new episodes released on Disney+ during the service's first year. The seventh and final season premiered on February 21, 2020.

Chronological order
While the series is designed to be an anthology of both standalone episodes and small story arcs, various events throughout inform stories, characters, and relationships to create a recognizably continuous narrative. In recognition of the release of the complete series on Netflix, StarWars.com released the official chronological episode order for the first six seasons on March 17, 2014; this was later updated to include links to the episodes on Disney+. Regarding the seventh and final season, StarWars.com revealed that episodes five through eight are set before the season premiere "The Bad Batch".

The Clone Wars Legacy 
At the time of cancellation in March 2013, there were still many episodes in development. Thirteen of these episodes were finished to become part of Season 6: The Lost Missions but there were still additional arcs that were never released. Lucasfilm released details of multiple story arcs from the unfinished episodes in September 2014. The Bad Batch was eventually completed and aired as the first arc of season 7.

Print

Darth Maul: Son of Dathomir 
A four-episode arc continued the story of Darth Maul following the events of the season 5 episode "The Lawless". The four episodes were titled: "The Enemy of My Enemy", "A Tale of Two Apprentices", "Proxy War", and "Showdown on Dathomir" (original production codes: 6.21–6.24). According to Dave Filoni, the four scripts "came out of one of our story conferences with George Lucas". The scripts and designs for the arc were adapted into a four-issue comic book titled Darth Maul: Son of Dathomir, released in August 2014 by the publisher Dark Horse Comics. The comic was the last Star Wars comic published by Dark Horse before Lucasfilm transferred the license to Marvel Comics in 2014 and was collected into a trade paperback by Marvel in 2018.

The plot follows Darth Maul, who was captured by Darth Sidious at the end of the season 5 episode "The Lawless". He is tortured by Count Dooku for information about the Shadow Collective and the allies Maul has made. Maul escapes and heads to Zanbar to command the Death Watch army, but is followed by General Grievous and his droids. They battle Maul and the Mandalorians, who are soon overwhelmed by the droids. Maul flees and confers with Mother Talzin, who is revealed to be his biological mother, and plots to draw out Sidious by capturing Dooku and Grievous. The scheme works, and Talzin is able to restore herself to her physical form, but sacrifices herself to save Maul and is killed by Grievous. Although Maul escapes with a company of loyal Mandalorians, the Shadow Collective has fallen apart due to the conflict with Sidious, as the Hutts, Pykes, and Black Sun have all abandoned Maul.

Dark Disciple
An eight-episode arc with Asajj Ventress and Jedi Quinlan Vos was adapted into a novel by Christie Golden titled Dark Disciple, released on July 7, 2015. The eight episodes were titled: "Lethal Alliance", "The Mission", "Conspirators", "Dark Disciple", "Saving Vos, Part I", "Saving Vos, Part II", "Traitor", and "The Path" (original production codes: 6.13–6.16 and 7.05–7.08). The story follows Vos partnering up with Ventress, hoping to execute Count Dooku. Eric Goldman of IGN gave the book an 8 out of 10, saying it was great.

Story reels

Crystal Crisis on Utapau
In September 2014, four unfinished episodes were released in completed story reel format, titled: "A Death on Utapau", "In Search of the Crystal", "Crystal Crisis", and "The Big Bang" (original production codes: 6.01–6.04). The arc takes place on Utapau with Obi-Wan and Anakin investigating an arms deal involving the Separatists and a kyber crystal. The arc also deals with Anakin's feelings after Ahsoka left the Jedi Order. It was included in the season 6 Blu-ray.

The Bad Batch
The story reels for this four-episode arc were screened on April 17, 2015, at Star Wars Celebration Anaheim, and were later released on the official Star Wars website on April 29. Scripted by Brent Friedman, the four episodes were later completed and aired as the first arc of season 7 (with some changes from the original story reels). A spin-off sequel series titled Star Wars: The Bad Batch was announced in 2020; it follows the titular group of clones working as mercenaries in the immediate aftermath of the Clone Wars.

See also
 List of Star Wars: Clone Wars episodes
 Star Wars: The Clone Wars (film)

References 
Footnotes

Citations

External links 
 
 Skymovies.com Episode Guide
 The Clone Wars section on StarWars.com
 CartoonNetwork.com Schedule
 Chronological order on StarWars.com

Clone Wars episodes
Star Wars: The Clone Wars
Star Wars: The Clone Wars